Tylissus or Tylissos, or Tylisus or Tylisos (Τύλισος), was a town of ancient Crete. On its ancient coins are found on the reverse a young man holding in his right hand the head of an ibex or wild goat, and in his left a bow. 

Its site is located near modern Tylissos.

References

Populated places in ancient Crete
Former populated places in Greece